Ill Wind may refer to:

Ill Wind (Arlen-Koehler song), a 1934 song by Harold Arlen and Ted Koehler
"Ill Wind", a song from the 1963 revue At the Drop of Another Hat
Ill Wind, a 1995 book written by Kevin J. Anderson and Doug Beason
"Ill Wind", a song by Radiohead released on the special edition of the 2016 album A Moon Shaped Pool